Matthew B. Kibbe is the President and Chief Community Organizer of Free the People, a non-profit organization dedicated to promoting libertarian ideals. Prior to founding Free the People, he was the President of FreedomWorks  He also worked as Chief of Staff to U.S. Representative Dan Miller (R-FL), Senior Economist at the Republican National Committee. Director of Federal Budget Policy at the U.S. Chamber of Commerce, and Managing Editor of Market Process, an academic economics journal published by the Center for the Study of Market Processes at George Mason University.

Kibbe's Free the People argued for the inclusion of third-party candidates in the 2016 presidential debates, and he participated in Our America Initiative's 2016 Liberty Tour to promote this campaign. In an interview with Glenn Beck, Kibbe accused the Commission on Presidential Debates of "rigging" the debates by excluding third parties.

FreedomWorks
Kibbe originally joined the organization (previously known as Citizens for a Sound Economy) as a policy analyst in 1986. He was the President from 2004–2015. He was formerly CEO, the post now held by Adam Brandon. 
According to Steve Forbes, “Kibbe has been to FreedomWorks what Steve Jobs was to Apple.”  
Kibbe and FreedomWorks Chairman Dick Armey wrote Give Us Liberty: A Tea Party Manifesto in 2010. The book reached best-seller lists including those of USA Today  and The Washington Post.

Personal life
Kibbe's wife, Terry, is the Chief Executive Officer for Free the People.

Works

References

External links
Profile at OpenSecrets.org

Living people
American chief executives
American libertarians
Blaze Media people
Tea Party movement activists
Grove City College alumni
1960s births
Date of birth missing (living people)
Place of birth missing (living people)